The Directors Guild of America Award for Outstanding Directorial Achievement of a First-Time Feature Film Director is one of the annual Directors Guild of America Awards given by Directors Guild of America. It was first awarded at the 68th Directors Guild of America Awards.

Winners and nominees

 † – indicates a nomination for the Academy Award for Best Director.
 ‡ – indicates a nomination for the DGA Award for Outstanding Directing.

2010s

2020s

References

External links
  (official website)

Directors Guild of America Awards
Directorial debut film awards
Awards established in 2015